Kirby James Hensley (July 23, 1911 – March 19, 1999) was the president and founder of the Universal Life Church (ULC.)

Biography
The second of seven children, Hensley was born on July 23, 1911, in the mountains of Low Gap, Yancey County, North Carolina. For more than 65 years he studied and preached religion throughout the United States. Illiterate his entire life, he hired others to read the Bible for him and later listened to recordings of the Bible on tape.

Hensley was ordained in a branch of the Baptist Church, but after several years he left the denomination and attended the Pentecostal churches in the area. He married his first wife Nora in a Pentecostal church ceremony; they had two daughters together. He also pastored in Oklahoma and California.

Hensley later divorced Nora and moved back to North Carolina, where he met his second wife, Lida. During their forty-six-year marriage, they had one daughter and two sons.

In the mid-1980s, Hensley called himself the King of Aqualandia and sold citizenship documents, as well as church ordinations, for $35. He ran for President of the United States as the Universal Party's candidate  in 1964 and 1968, with Roscoe MacKenna as his running mate.

Hensley remained president of the church until his death on March 19, 1999. He compiled many sermons and once appeared on 60 Minutes.

References

Sources

1911 births
1999 deaths
Universal Life Church
People from Yancey County, North Carolina
20th-century Baptist ministers from the United States
Baptists from North Carolina